The Journal of Small Business Management is a quarterly peer-reviewed academic journal published by Taylor & Francis on behalf of the International Council for Small Business (ICSB), and circulated in over 60 countries. The journal was published by Wiley-Blackwell until January 2020. The journal was first published in February 1963. It covers all aspects of small business management and entrepreneurship, and was the first journal dedicated to these topics. The editor-in-chief is Dr. Ayman El Tarabishy (George Washington University).

According to the publisher's website, the journal has a 2019 Journal Citation Reports impact factor of 3.461. Journal of Small Business Management was listed as a Financial Times top 40 journal between 2007-2010.

References

External links 
 

Small business
Wiley-Blackwell academic journals
Quarterly journals
Business and management journals
English-language journals
Publications established in 1963